Cuando calienta el sol is a 1963 Argentine film directed by Julio Saraceni.

It is also the title of a famous song of the period, first recorded by Los Hermanos Rigual in 1962 and subsequently by many other artists. Love Me with All Your Heart is the English version of the same tune.

Cast
  Antonio Prieto
  Beatriz Taibo
  Augusto Codecá
  Perla Alvarado
  Nelson Prenat
  Héctor Calcaño
  María Armand
  Roberto Blanco
  Eduardo Humberto Nóbili
  Roberto Bordoni
  Ricardo de Rosas
  Susana André
  Alberto Barcel
  Gladys Gastaldi
 Tía Berta
  Roberto Raimundo
  Linda Renao
  Juan Carlos Cevallos

References

External links
 

1963 films
1960s Spanish-language films
Argentine black-and-white films
Films directed by Julio Saraceni
1960s Argentine films